Thiruthaleeshwarar Temple is located 1.5 kilometer southeast of the Aranvoyal, Thiruvallur District, Tamil Nadu, India. Many are the legends about this tiny village of Aranvoyal but none to illustrate the presence of image of Lord Vishnu in the open fields. An image of a Consort of Lord Vishnu was also present nearby. This temple was built by the Pallava Ruler Nandhivarman II almost 1200 years back. This temple has the reputation of dissolving 'Nag' Doshas of devotees who seek the blessings of the Lord. The temple is now only a mound of rubble with the sanctum (‘sannadhi' in Tamil language) of all deities in a dilapidated state. This is due to lack of adequate funds and administrative difficulties. The deities present include the Thiruthaleeshwarar (Lord Shiva)), Goddess Marakathaambika, Shri Dakshinamurthy (Guru Bhagwan), Lord Prahara Ganesh, Lord Murugan, Lord Surya Bhagwan, Shri Kailashanathar, Shri Chandrasekar, Shri Kasi Viswanathar, Shri Bhairavar, Somasakandhar, Maanikavaasagar and Sage Pathanjali.

Overview
The temple faces the south direction with no main Gopuram. The process of constructing a 30 feet Raja Gopuram is going on in full swing. After crossing the courtyard one can find the sanctum of Lord Thiruthaleeshwarar facing the east direction. Goddess Marakathaambika faces the south direction. In the sanctum of Lord Thiruthaleeshwarar, the flying machine (vimaan or vimaanam in Tamil language) is portrayed as 'Gaja Bristha' flying machine. Generally, the image of the God who is present in the sanctum is usually embossed on the flying machine but, in this case, the flying machine present in the Lord Shiva sanctum has the image of Lord Murugan sitting majestically. This is considered a rarity.

Historical importance
This temple has markings on its walls, inner sanctum, Nandhi statue and flying machine which can shed more light on the ancient Tamil culture and behavior of people. They can also reveal intricate and minute details about the history of this temple. One can also see a lot of inscriptions and markings on the temple walls. The temple is situated in a sprawling area of 14 acres. Of which 7 acres (approx) is occupied by the Holy Temple Tank. The temple has a built up area of around 5000 sq ft.

Raja Gopuram construction
There is a proposal to build a Raja Gopuram up to a height of 30 feet. Funds to the tune of Rs 2.5 million are needed. Staunch devotees of Lord Shiva are requested to contribute to the maximum extent possible by them. The construction is expected to be completed within the year 2017.

Directions to visit Temple
The temple is located in Aranvoyal on the Chennai - Thiruvallur High Road. A person has to take the narrow road opposite the Kingfisher Distilleries. After travelling for around 1.5 km along the winding road, the road splits itself into two. Take the street on the left hand side and after 150 metres, again take the road on the left hand side. The entrance of the temple can be seen. MTC Bus numbers 566A, 501, 501X, 597, 153A, 153B, 153T stops at Aranvoyal bus stand. Auto/Share Auto facilities are  available. Devotees can either walk, enjoying the scenic view along the road, or deploy a cab to take them to the temple. It is recommended that people desirous of visiting the temple are requested to contact the Parambarai Arankavalar before proceeding, as the temple is opened for Dharshan only sparingly.

References

Hindu temples in Tiruvallur district